Group D of the 2001 Fed Cup Europe/Africa Zone Group II was one of four pools in the Europe/Africa zone of the 2001 Fed Cup. Five teams competed in a round robin competition, with the top team advancing to Group I for 2002.

Turkey vs. Botswana

Lithuania vs. Tunisia

Turkey vs. Moldova

Lithuania vs. Botswana

Turkey vs. Tunisia

Moldova vs. Botswana

Turkey vs. Lithuania

Moldova vs. Tunisia

Lithuania vs. Moldova

Tunisia vs. Botswana

  placed first in this group and thus advanced to Group I for 2002, where they placed last in their pool of four, and was thus relegated back to Group II for 2003.

See also
Fed Cup structure

References

External links
 Fed Cup website

2001 Fed Cup Europe/Africa Zone